Konan Ahuie (born 12 June 1994) is an Ivorian footballer who plays as defender.

References

External links

Profile at FC Slutsk website

1994 births
Living people
Ivorian footballers
Association football defenders
Ivorian expatriate footballers
Expatriate footballers in Belarus
Expatriate footballers in Libya
Expatriate footballers in Saudi Arabia
Ivorian expatriate sportspeople in Saudi Arabia
FC Slutsk players
Issia Wazy players
Al-Entesar Club players
Saudi Second Division players
People from Adzopé